Named may refer to something that has been given a name.

Named may also refer to:

 named (computing), a widely used DNS server
 Naming (parliamentary procedure)
 The Named (band), an American industrial metal group

In literature:

 The Named, a fantasy novel by Marianne Curley
 The Named, a fictional race of prehistoric big cats, depicted in The Books of the Named series by Clare Bell

See also 

 Name (disambiguation)
 Names (disambiguation)
 Naming (disambiguation)